The International Tennis Tournament of Cortina is a professional tennis tournament played on outdoor red clay courts. It is currently part of the Association of Tennis Professionals (ATP) Challenger Tour. It is held annually in Cortina d'Ampezzo, Italy, since 2014.

Past finals

Singles

Doubles

External links
Official website
ITF Search 

 
ATP Challenger Tour
Clay court tennis tournaments
Tennis tournaments in Italy